Semana santa en Acapulco ("Holy Week in Acapulco") is a 1981 Mexican film. It was directed by Luis Alcoriza.

External links
 

1981 films
Mexican comedy-drama films
1980s Spanish-language films
Films directed by Luis Alcoriza
1980s Mexican films